Aaron Fisher may refer to:

 Aaron Fisher, identified as "Victim 1" in the Penn State child sex abuse scandal, see Silent No More
 Aaron R. Fisher (1892–1985),  U.S. Army officer